Castle Blunden is a historic country house in Kilkenny, home to the Blunden family.

House
The house itself is a classical style three storey detached country house with a single story Doric portico. The house dates from about 1750 and is believed to have been designed by Francis Bindon and is considered to have been designed in a style like that of nearby contemporary Bonnettstown Hall. The house has been maintained so that the original character remains. The house is limestone with heraldic plaques in the centre of the top floor.

History

Overington Blunden of Southwark, London was granted lands in Kilkenny in 1667 along with land in Offaly, Waterford and Tipperary. He is listed as a Cromwellian Adventurer and at least some of his lands were taken from the Kilkenny local Shee family. His descendant was the barrister Sir John Blunden, 1st Baronet who built and lived in Castle Blunden. Like his father he was a member of the Irish House of Commons, elected for the constituency of Kilkenny City in 1761. He was made a Baronet on 12 March 1766. It remains the seat of the Blunden baronets with the 8th Baronet Blunden taking over the title on 9 April 2007 though he had to wait until 2017 to take over the house itself.

See also
List of historic houses in the Republic of Ireland

References

Historic buildings and structures in Ireland
County Kilkenny